A Walk Along the Ganges (1986) is a travelogue written by Dennison Berwick. In this book, author tells about journey, a 2000 miles along the Ganges, the Indian river.

Background 
The idea of walking along the river came to Berwick's mind, when he was "gazing over" Nile. In introduction of the book he wrote, from his childhood he had a wish to come to India and explore the India. Through this 2000 miles journey he attempted to explore the country.

Content 
The book was divided into several chapters. He started with giving acknowledgement to those people from who got assistance throughout his journey and an author's note where he discussed how and when the idea of travelling the length of the river struck his mind and how he prepared for it. Then he divided the book in fourteen chapters, in which he narrated different experienced which he gathered during the journey.

References 

Travelogues
Books about India
1986 non-fiction books
Ganges
Hiking books